The Oakland Section (OS) is the governing body of high school sports for school for the Oakland Unified School District. It is one of ten sections that comprise the California Interscholastic Federation (CIF). The OS has further divided the Bay Area Charter School Athletic Conference (BACSAC) and Oakland Athletic League (OAL).

History
The California Interscholastic League has suggested that OS merged with the CIF North Coast Section, as the OS is one of the smallest sections in the CIF.

In 2010–11 school year, charter schools in Oakland formed the Bay Area Charter School Athletic Conference and joined the Oakland Section.

Members

OAL
Castlemont High School
Coliseum College Prep Academy
Fremont High School
Life Academy of Health and Bioscience
Madison Park Academy
McClymonds High School
Oakland High School
Oakland International High School
Oakland Technical High School
Skyline High School

BACSAC
American Indian Public High School(AIMS)]]
ARISE High School
Bay Area Technology School
Aspire California College Preparatory Academy
Envision Academy of Arts & Technology
FAME Public Charter School
Aspire Golden State College Preparatory Academy
Impact Academy of Arts & Technology
KIPP King Collegiate High School
Leadership Public School - Hayward
Lighthouse Community Charter School
Aspire Lionel Wilson Preparatory Academy
Oakland Charter High School
Oakland Unity High School

References

California Interscholastic Federation sections